Allana Harkin (born in Hamilton, Ontario, Canada) is a Canadian comedian, actress, and playwright.

Harkin wrote the comedy play Real Estate, which premiered at Theatre Collingwood and later became very successful at Theatre Aquarius. She is also a former member of all-female comedy troupe the Atomic Fireballs. It was through this troupe that Harkin first met Samantha Bee, the group's co-founder. Bee and Harkin later collaborated on the parenting blog "Eating Over the Sink" for the website Babble.com, and have since been described as "best friends".

When Bee later became the host of Full Frontal with Samantha Bee, she called Harkin immediately to ask her to work on the show's staff. Harkin is currently the producer of, and a correspondent on, this show. Harkin occasionally acts in films, having appeared in both The Birder (2014) and Patch Town (2015).

References

External links

Actresses from Hamilton, Ontario
Canadian film actresses
Canadian women comedians
Canadian women dramatists and playwrights
Living people
Year of birth missing (living people)
Primetime Emmy Award winners